Taimur Saleem Khan Jhagra (born 9 November 1977) is a Pakistani politician who was the Provincial Minister of Khyber Pakhtunkhwa for Finance and Health, in office since 29 August 2018 till 18 January 2023. He had been a member of the Provincial Assembly of Khyber Pakhtunkhwa from August 2018 till January 2023.

Early life and education
Jhagra was born on 9 November 1977 in Peshawar, Khyber Pakhtunkhwa, Pakistan. 
He is the son of retired federal secretary Mohammad Saleem Khan Jhagra, nephew of late PPP leader and provincial minister Iftikhar Jhagra and grandson of two influential personalities hailing from the province; Mohammad Ibrahim Khan Jhagra, who was a leading figure in the Pakistan movement, and one of the most respected political personalities in the then North West Frontier Province (NWFP); and of  Ghulam Ishaq Khan, the influential bureaucrat who served as President of Pakistan between 1988 and 1993.

Jhagra received his primary education in Peshawar, at the PAF (Pakistan Air Force) Degree College School, and his secondary education at The New School Rome, Italy. After completely his pre-engineering studies, also from the PAF Degree College Peshawar, Jhagra graduated with a Bachelor of Science degree in Mechanical Engineering from the Ghulam Ishaq Khan Institute of Engineering Sciences and Technology followed by an MBA (Master of Business Administration) from the London Business School in 2008.

Political career
Jhagra began his political career after quitting his job as partner at McKinsey & Company.

In January 2018, he joined Pakistan Tehreek-e-Insaf (PTI). Following which he was allocated PTI ticket to contest the 2018 general election from Constituency PK-73 (Peshawar-VIII) despite stiff opposition from within PTI. It was noted that at-least 33 PTI workers had applied for a ticket for Constituency PK-73 (Peshawar-VIII) many of which were locals but PTI decided to allocate the ticket to Jhagra, who is relatively unknown in the constituency.

He was elected to the Provincial Assembly of Khyber Pakhtunkhwa as a candidate of PTI from Constituency PK-73 (Peshawar-VIII) in the 2018 general election. He received 15,449 votes and defeated Aman Ullah, a candidate of Muttahida Majlis-e-Amal.

On 29 August 2018, he was inducted into the Khyber Pakhtunkhwa provincial cabinet of Chief Minister Mahmood Khan and was appointed as Provincial Minister of Khyber Pakhtunkhwa for Finance.

On February 5, 2020, he was also given the additional portfolio of Health.

Across health and finance, he has been appreciated for the breadth and depth of reform carried out, which has helped bring Khyber Pakhtunkhwa, a small province, into the limelight as the province leading on reform in the country.

References

Living people
Pashtun people
Alumni of London Business School
Provincial ministers of Khyber Pakhtunkhwa
Pakistan Tehreek-e-Insaf MPAs (Khyber Pakhtunkhwa)
1977 births